Robert "Buzz" Berger (born February 9, 1934, in Chicago) is an American film producer.

Among other films, he was the producer for the Emmy Award-winning TV miniseries Holocaust.

Partial filmography
 1974 The Missiles of October
 1978 Holocaust
 1982 My Body, My Child
 1987 Mandela (a film about Nelson Mandela)
 1997 The House of Yes

See also
1974 in film

External links

Film producers from Illinois
1934 births
Living people